The Western Wall Tunnel (translit.: Minharat Hakotel) is a tunnel exposing the Western Wall from where the traditional, open-air prayer site ends and up to the Wall's northern end. Most of the tunnel is in continuation of the open-air Western Wall and is located under buildings of the Muslim Quarter of the Old City of Jerusalem. The tunnel allows access to the remainder of the Wall in a northerly direction.

The tunnel is connected to several adjacent excavated underground spaces, many of which can be visited together with the main tunnel. For this reason the plural form, Western Wall Tunnels, is often being used.

History
In 19 BCE, King Herod undertook a project to double the area of the Temple Mount in Jerusalem by incorporating part of the hill on the Northwest. In order to do so, four retaining walls were constructed, and the Temple Mount was expanded on top of them. These retaining walls remained standing, along with the platform itself, after the Temple was destroyed by the Romans in 70 CE.

Since then much of the area next to the walls became covered and built upon.
Part of the Western Wall remained exposed after the destruction of the Temple. Since it was the closest area to the Temple’s Holy of Holies that remained accessible, it became a place of Jewish prayer for millennia.

Excavation

British researchers started excavating the Western Wall in the mid 19th century. Charles Wilson began the excavations in 1864 and was followed by Charles Warren in 1867–70. It is believed that the arch supported a bridge which connected the Temple Mount to the city during the Second Temple Period. Warren dug shafts through Wilson’s Arch which are still visible today.

After the Six-Day War, the Ministry of Religious Affairs of Israel began the excavations aimed at exposing the continuation of the Western Wall. The excavations lasted almost twenty years and revealed many previously unknown facts about the history and geography of the Temple Mount. The excavations were difficult to conduct, as the tunnels ran below residential neighborhoods constructed on top of ancient structures from the Second Temple Period. The excavations were conducted with the supervision of scientific and rabbinic experts. This was to ensure both the stability of the structures above and to prevent damaging the historic artifacts. In 1988 the Western Wall Heritage Foundation was formed, it took over the excavation, maintenance and renovations of the Western Wall and Western Wall Plaza.

Features

Western Wall section
The tunnel exposes 300 m of the wall's total 445 m, revealing the construction methods and the various activities in the vicinity of the Temple Mount. The excavations included many archaeological finds along the way, including discoveries from the Herodian period (streets, monumental masonry), sections of a reconstruction of the Western Wall dating to the Umayyad period, and various structures dating to the Ayyubid, Mamluke and Hasmonean periods constructed to support buildings in the vicinity of the Temple Mount.

Warren's Gate
"Warren's Gate" lies about  into the tunnel. This sealed-off entrance was for hundreds of years a small synagogue called "The Cave", where the early Muslims allowed the Jews to pray in close proximity to the ruins of the Temple. Rabbi Yehuda Getz built a synagogue just outside the gate, since today it is the closest point a Jew can pray near to the Holy of Holies, assuming it was located at the traditional site under the Dome of the Rock.

Hasmonean Channel
Beyond the northern end of the Western Wall, remains were found of a water channel that originally supplied water to the Temple Mount. The exact source of the channel is unknown, though it passes through an underground pool known as the "Struthion Pool". The water channel was dated to the Hasmonean period and was accordingly dubbed the "Hasmonean Channel".

517-tonne stone
The biggest stone in the Western Wall, often called the Western Stone, is also revealed within the tunnel, and ranks as one of the heaviest objects ever lifted by human beings without powered machinery.

Chain of Generations Center
Adjacent to the tunnel are the remains of Second Temple period, Crusader, and Mamluk structures. In the restored rooms, the Western Wall Foundation has created the Chain of Generations Center, a Jewish history museum designed by Eliav Nahlieli that  includes an audiovisual show and nine glass sculptures created by glass artist Jeremy Langford.

Roman street to the Temple Mount
In 2007, the Israel Antiquities Authority uncovered an ancient Roman street thought to be from the second to fourth centuries. It was a side street which likely connected two major roads, and led up to the Temple Mount. The discovery of the road gave further evidence that Romans continued to use the Temple Mount after the destruction of the temple in 70 CE. Excavations at the site continued as late as 2014, led by archaeologists Peter Gendelman and Ortal Chalaf on behalf of the Israel Antiquities Authority (IAA).

Struthion Pool

The Struthion Pool (sometimes described as the "Struthion Pools", in the plural), is a large cuboid cistern, which gathered the rainwater from guttering on the Forum buildings. Prior to Hadrian, this cistern had been an open-air pool, but Hadrian added arch vaulting to enable the pavement to be placed over it. The existence of the pool in the first century is attested by Josephus, who reports that it was called "Struthius" (sparrow). This Struthion Pool was originally built as part of an open-air water conduit by the Hasmoneans, which has since been enclosed; the source of the water for this conduit is currently unidentified.

As a result of 1971 extensions to the original Western Wall Tunnel, the Hasmonean water system, which runs under Arab housing, became linked to the end of the Western Wall Tunnel, and later opened as a tourist attraction. The course takes a linear route starting at the Western Wall Plaza and passes through the modern tunnels and the ancient water system, ending at the Struthion Pool. The Sisters of Zion do not allow tourists to exit into the convent at the Struthion Pool, so tourists return through the narrow tunnels to the starting point, although this does create some logistical problems.

Northern exit

Originally, visitors had to retrace their steps back to the entrance. A connection to the Hasmonean water system was made, but this still required them to make a U-turn once they had reached the Struthion Pool. Digging an alternative exit from the tunnel was proposed, but initially rejected on the grounds that any exit would be seen as an attempt by the Jewish authorities to stake a claim to ownership of the nearby land — part of the Muslim Quarter of the city. In 1996, however, Benjamin Netanyahu authorized the creation of an exit leading to the Via Dolorosa, underneath the Ummariya madrasah. Over the subsequent few weeks, 80 people were killed as a result of riots against the creation of the exit. A modern wall divides the Struthion pool into two parts, preventing access between them. One side is visible from the western wall tunnels, and the other area is accessible from the Convent of the Sisters of Zion. Since then, it has been possible for large numbers of tourists to enter the tunnel's southern entrance near the Western Wall, walk the tunnel's length with a tour guide, and exit from the northern end. This exit is only open during daytime, owing to continued security concerns.

See also
 Excavations at the Temple Mount
 Archaeology of Israel
 Tourism in Israel

References

External links

 Information from the Kotel site in English 
 Jeremy Langford's glass sculptures in "The Chain of Generations Center" in the Western Wall Tunnels 
 Read the iTour Jerusalem review of the Western Wall Tunnel 
 Ivanovsky E., Van Zaiden A., Vaknin Y., Abksis E. (2007). Conservation of the western ritual bath (miqve) in the Western Wall tunnel  Conservation Department - Israel Antiquities Authority.

Jews and Judaism in the Roman Empire
Classical sites in Jerusalem
Temple Mount
Medieval sites in Jerusalem
Tunnels
Establishments in the Herodian kingdom